The 1967 UCI Road World Championships took place on 3 September 1967 in Heerlen, Netherlands.

Results

Medal table

External links 

 Men's results
 Women's results
  Results at sportpro.it

 
UCI Road World Championships by year
UCI Road World Championships 1967
Uci Road World Championships, 1967
1967 in road cycling
Cycling in Heerlen